Palatinate of Kyiv may refer to

 Principality of Kiev, 1132–1471
 Kiev Voivodeship, 1471–1793

See also 

 Kiev Governorate (1708–1764)
 Kiev Viceroyalty, 1775–1796
 Kiev Governorate, 1796–1925
 Kyiv Governorate General, or Southwestern Krai